Norvell V. Coots is an American physician, hospital administrator and retired military officer. Since August 1, 2016, he has been president and CEO of Holy Cross Health,  a Catholic, not-for-profit health system in Maryland that is part of Trinity Health. As a medical officer in the United States Army, he served as Commanding General and CEO of Regional Health Command Europe, and Command Surgeon, U.S. Army Europe and Seventh Army,  and earlier as the final head of the Walter Reed Army Medical Center and Walter Reed Health Care System in Washington, D.C.  He retired as a brigadier general.

He is a member of the board of directors of Quality of Life Plus. He was named to the 2019 list of Physician Leaders to Know compiled by Becker's Hospital Review.

His father, W. Norvell Coots, was also a doctor.

Publications

References

External links 
 
   

Howard University alumni
Excelsior College alumni
United States Army War College alumni
University of Oklahoma alumni
American dermatologists
American chief executives
Year of birth missing (living people)
United States Army officers
Living people